Masatoshi Yokota (January 11, 1899 – July 1, 1984) was the 4th Chief Justice of Japan (1966–1969). He was born in Hakodate, Hokkaido. He graduated from the University of Tokyo. He was a recipient of the Order of the Rising Sun. He was a practitioner of kendo.

References

Bibliography
山本祐司『最高裁物語（上・下）』（日本評論社、1994年）（講談社+α文庫、1997年）

External links
公正取引協会　横田正俊記念賞
長野市ホームページ - 課・支所別メニュー - 旧横田家住宅

1899 births
1984 deaths
Chief justices of Japan
Grand Cordons of the Order of the Rising Sun
University of Tokyo alumni
People from Hakodate